The coat of arms of The Hague is the official symbol of the city of The Hague.

It consists of a golden escutcheon with a stork in natural colors holding a black eel, a count's crown as coronet, and two golden lions rampant regardant as supporters standing on a green decorative compartment. On 27 September 2012, the motto Vrede en Recht (English: Peace and Justice) was added to the compartment, referring to the city's global recognition as the home of international justice and accountability.

Older versions

References

Hague
Culture in The Hague
Hague
Hague
Hague
Hague